Events in the year 1854 in India.

Incumbents
James Broun-Ramsay, 1st Marquess of Dalhousie, Governor-General of India, 1848 to 1856
Vyankatrao I Raje Ghorpade, Raja of Mudhol State, 20 February 1818-December 1854
Balwantrao Raje Ghorpade, Raja of Mudhol State, December 1854-27 March 1862
Thakur Sahib Akherajji IV Bhavsimhji, Rajput of Bhavnagar State, 1852–1854
Thakur Sahib Jashwantsimhji Bhavsimhji, Rajput of Bhavnagar State, 1854–11 April 1870
Muhammad Said Khan, Nawab of Rampur from 1840 to 1855, died on 1 April
Ghulam Muhammad Ghouse Khan, Nawab of the Carnatic, 1825-1855

Events
 March–  The British Raj annexed Jhansi, Lakshmibai was given a pension of 60,000 and ordered to leave the palace and the fort.
The British Raj annexed Jhansi, Nagpur, and Oudh and began annexing Udaipur State, Chhattisgarh
Nagpur became the administrative division of Chota Nagpur Division
Bhopal Agency was absorbed into the Central India Agency
The British medal first issued the India General Service Medal (1854) to exceptional British and Indian soldiers
Calcutta Survey first issued Inverted Head 4 Annas postage stamps
Dalhousie, India, a hill station in Himachal Pradesh, was established by the British Empire's government in India as a summer retreat for its troops and officials
Howrah Junction railway station was opened
The first train ran on Eastern Railway zone between Howrah and Hooghly on 15 August
The Dalhousie administration formally dissolved Fort William College
The East India Company formed the 3rd Bengal (European) Light Infantry which later helped suppress the Indian Rebellion of 1857
Woodstock School, a Christian, international, co-educational, residential school located in Landour, a small hill station contiguous with the town of Mussoorie, Uttarakhand, was established
Government College of Art & Craft, one of the oldest art colleges in India, was established on 16 August at Garanhata, Chitpur
Government Arts College, Kumbakonam was established on 19 October in Kumbakonam in Tamil Nadu
Happy Valley Tea Estate, a tea garden in Darjeeling district in the Indian state of West Bengal, was established
Khana railway station was established
The portion of the Great Indian Peninsula Railway from Tannah to Callian was opened on May 1
Dadabhai Naoroji founded a Gujarati fortnightly publication, the Rast Goftar ('The Truth Teller'), to clarify Zoroastrian concepts and promote Parsi social reforms
Alexander Cunningham, a British army engineer with the Bengal Engineer Group, published LADĀK: Physical, Statistical, and Historical with Notices of the Surrounding Countries
Nathan Brown, an American missionary, published খ্রীষ্টৰ বিবৰণ আৰু শুভ বাৰ্তা, Jesus Christ and his Holy Messages
William Prinsep sold Belvedere Estate to the East India Company

Law
Telegraph Act

Births
Abdul Hafiz Mohamed Barakatullah, anti-British Indian revolutionary with sympathy for the Pan-Islamic movement, born on 7 July at Itwra Mohalla, Bhopal in Madhya Pradesh
John Frederick McCrea, a South African recipient of the Victoria Cross, born on 2 April 1854 in Madras
Matilda Smith, botanical artist whose work appeared in Curtis's Botanical Magazine for over forty years
Isabel Cooper-Oakley, a prominent Theosophist and author, born on 31 January in Amritsar
Arthur Anthony Macdonell, a noted Sanskrit scholar, born on 11 May in Muzaffarpur
Richmond Ritchie, a British civil servant, born in Calcutta
Vasudevanand Saraswati, Saint who is regarded as an incarnation of Lord Dattatreya, born on 13 August in Sindhudurg, Maharashtra, India

Deaths
Armine Simcoe Henry Mountain, British Army officer who served as Adjutant-General in India, died on 8 February 1854 in Fatehgarh
Vyankatrao I Raje Ghorpade, Raja of the Mudhol State
Thakur Sahib Akherajji IV Bhavsimhji, Rajput of Bhavnagar State

References

 
India
Years of the 19th century in India